
Gmina Sędziszów is an urban-rural gmina (administrative district) in Jędrzejów County, Świętokrzyskie Voivodeship, in south-central Poland.

Villages
Apart from the town of Sędziszów, Gmina Sędziszów contains the villages and settlements of Aleksandrów, Białowieża, Boleścice, Borszowice, Bugaj, Czekaj, Czepiec, Gniewięcin, Grązów, Jeżów, Klimontów, Klimontówek, Krzcięcice, Krzelów, Łowinia, Marianów, Mierzyn, Mstyczów, Pawłowice, Pawłowice-Zagaje, Piła, Piołunka, Podsadek, Przełaj, Przełaj Czepiecki, Słaboszowice, Sosnowiec, Swaryszów, Szałas, Tarnawa, Wojciechowice, Wydanka and Zielonki.

Neighbouring gminas
Gmina Sędziszów is bordered by the gminas of Jędrzejów, Kozłów, Nagłowice, Słupia, Wodzisław and Żarnowiec.

References
Polish official population figures 2006

Sedziszow
Jędrzejów County